HLA-B41 (B41) is an HLA-B serotype. The serotype identifies HLA-B*4101, *4102, *4103 gene products. (For terminology help see: HLA-serotype tutorial)

Serotype

Allele frequencies

References

4